Dolichupis virgo is a species of small sea snail, a marine gastropod mollusk in the family Triviidae, the false cowries or trivias.

Distribution

Description
The maximum recorded shell length is 7.3 mm.

Habitat
Minimum recorded depth is 33 m. Maximum recorded depth is 33 m.

References

Triviidae
Gastropods described in 2005